Božidar Knežević (3 March 1862, Ub - 18 February 1905, Belgrade) was a Serbian philosopher, writer, and literary critic. Despite being educated for the priesthood, he abandoned the  Orthodox religion, and began to develop his career in science and topics of social regeneration. He rejected dogmatism, believing instead that neither religious nor historical nor scientific knowledge could be wholly accurate.

Biography

Božidar Knežević was born in Ub, in the municipality of Valjevo, on March 3, 1862. He completed his gymnasium and obtained his B.A. degree in History and Philosophy from Belgrade's Grandes écoles (University of Belgrade) in 1883. At that time he decided that a career in the clergy would be impossible for him due to his individualistic religious views. In 1884, a tryout at teaching at a Uzice gymnasium convinced him that he could become an educator. A year later, he took a few months' leave to volunteer for the Serbo-Bulgarian War. His view was both social and political. He believed in human dignity and the natural right to liberty. "As long as enslaved people exist, the free will be in danger," he wrote. For the next 20 years, he taught throughout Serbia, moving from one town to the next. During this period, he wrote and published several volumes. In 1889, he was transferred from his teaching post in Uzice to Nis. From 1893 to 1894 he was a high school teacher in Čačak, in Kragujevac, and again in Čačak, where he was finally made principal. Here he found a coterie of admirers; a change in fortune and reputation came with the publication of "Principi istorije" (Principles of history) in 1898. From that point on, history and philosophy were his major interests. He subsequently published "Red u Istoriji" (Discipline in History, 1898), "Proporcija u Istroiji" (Proportions in History, 1901), "Misli" (Thoughts), which appeared in serial form in Srpski Knjizevni Glasnik (Serbian Literary Herald) in 1901, and the second volume of "Principi istorije" also in 1901. He continued to hold his teaching and administrative job as secondary school principal in Šabac (1899-1902).

In 1902, Knežević was transferred back to Belgrade. He died at Belgrade of tuberculosis on 18 February 1905, age 43.

Philosophy

Božidar Knežević was a popular philosopher in Serbia at the end of the 19th century and into the early years of the 20th century. He developed a theory of universal evolution in his treatise "Principi Istorije" (Principles of History) and he contemplated history as human evolution towards a more unified humanity.

Knežević speculated on the nature of the universe and wondered about the meaning, purpose, and ultimate destiny of humankind within the cosmos. He postulated a cosmos that evolved through three major phases: organic, inorganic, and psychic.
He wrote, "A dogma is an embalmed thought: dead but whole, live but motionless, soulless but powerful." 
 
Knežević postulated that the whole, which is unconscious and general, precedes the part, which is conscious and specific. When the part separates from the whole, there is conflict with the whole and with other parts. From this conflict there arises a new order and proportionality which is only temporary and gives place to a new phase of disintegration. However, he believed that history demonstrated that the growth of civilization leads to increasing social justice and the elimination of irrationality in human life. Although Knežević assumed the existence of God as a primary and eternal substance, he held that as human altruism develops, man withdraws from God. Morality and more moral organization of social life are born out of pain and suffering. It consists in the liberation from all external forces and presupposes the overcoming of ordinary motives for human behavior.

However much one might be tempted to dismiss Knežević's philosophy as a quaint Balkan period piece, it is more than that. Its special rhetoric belongs to a dead past, but positivism and heroism both survived in various modelations in the late nineteenth century (1898) and at the turn of the twentieth century (1901), when Knežević was writing his treatise, Principi istorije (Principles of History, Volumes 1 & 2). In his major works, Knežević presented an original world-view that synthesizes both historicism and positivism with a cosmic scheme of things. The result is a vast, dynamic, and unique vision of mankind's place and destiny within the determining laws of an evolving then devolving universe.

"All things born must die. Only what never began will never end; what preceded everything else will survive everything else; what happened first will disappear last."

In his metaphysics, Knežević asserts the primacy of a deeper moral dimension of the world. Above truth, according to Knežević, stands justice. The discovery of the intrinsic justice in the world is achieved through truth. "The entire truth does not rest in any particular theory, idea or principle, as there are only particles of the whole truth...." writes Knežević. "Error is a belief that something untrue is true. A lie is a conscious distortion of truth. Error is noble and natural. Error is a lower degree of truth. A lie is an obstacle to truth."

He said, "The entire truth does not rest in any particular theory, idea or principle, as these are only particles of the whole truth...."

He envisioned a worldwide socio-cultural system as the outgrowth of human progress, grounded in science and historical understanding.

Work

In 1898 Knežević published his seminal work, "Principi istorije" (Principles of History) in two volumes. "Since everything that exists only in history", he argued, "history takes over the fields of other sciences and offers the highest human understanding". In addition, "history binds all peoples and leads to their reconciliation and overall harmony". Knežević’s optimism and belief in the progress of the human mind is tempered with his belief that "the total quantity of time available to the living is limited: human civilization and even human life is thus bound to disappear". Proportion is "the Telos (philosophy) of history." As both nature and humans strive after this ideal, "proportion is used to explain the nature of truth, reason, good, progress, beauty, justice and freedom". Once elements achieve proportion and balance with each other, "they live simultaneously" in a great organic whole in which one can ultimately arrive at "complete morality, freedom, justice and truth". Whereas academic philosophers repudiated this system as incoherent, many Serb avant-garde poets and writers found in it a congenial vision of the universe in which everything, including poetry and beauty, had its own rightful place in a world striving after proportion.

Knežević's other main works are "Red u Istoriji" (Discipline in History, 1898); "Proporcija u Istroiji" (Proportions in History, 1901); and "Misli" (Thoughts, which appeared in serial form in Srpski Knjizevni Glasnik/ Serbian Literary Herald, 1901). Today's Serbia does not look like the dark and hopeless "Stradija" (Land of Tribulation) as it seemed to Radoje Domanović and Knežević when he was writing his doleful "Misli" (Thoughts).

Knežević acknowledged Auguste Comte and Georg Wilhelm Friedrich Hegel as well as Karl Marx, Charles Darwin, and Herbert Spencer as inspirational for his own work. Although he continuously explored world literature in numerous languages (English, German, French, Italian and Russian), Knežević was heavily under the influence of English thought, and popularized concepts from English philosophy in Serbia. Knežević translated "On Heroes and Hero Worship and the Heroic in History" (1841) by Thomas Carlyle and "History of Civilization in England" (1857) by Henry Thomas Buckle. As a result of Knežević's translation, Carlyle became a familiar figure in Serbia.

Bibliography
Red u istoriji, 1898.
Principi istorije I, 1898.
Proporcije u istoriji, 1901.
Principi istorije II, 1901.
Misli, Belgrade, 1902.
Beležnica (1896-1897)

Translations:

On Heroes and Hero Worship and the Heroic in History, Thomas Carlyle
History of Civilization in England, Henry Thomas Buckle

See also
 Jovan Došenović
 Svetozar Marković
 Dimitrije Matić
 Konstantin Cukić

References
 
 Jovan Skerlić, Istorija nove srpske književnosti (Belgrade 1914, 1921) pages 438 and 439.

19th-century Serbian philosophers
Serbian writers
1862 births
1905 deaths
University of Belgrade alumni